Frank Rune Vestreng (born August 19, 1961) is a former Norwegian ice hockey player. He was born in Oslo, Norway, and played for the club Vålerengens IF. He played for the Norwegian national ice hockey team at the 1984 Winter Olympics.

References

External links
 

1961 births
Living people
Ice hockey players at the 1984 Winter Olympics
Norwegian ice hockey players
Olympic ice hockey players of Norway
Ice hockey people from Oslo